Coleophora isabellina is a moth of the family Coleophoridae. It is found in Uzbekistan.

Adults are whitish and do not have longitudinal grayish striae. They are on wing from August to the beginning of September.

The larvae feed on the fruit of Arbuscula richteri. They create a case which is similar to Coleophora tsherkesi, but usually darker (almost blackish). The case is silky and consists of five to six cylindrical belts, readily discernible only in incomplete and not fully covered cases. The valve is three-sided and constructed after discarding fruits at the caudal end of the case. Larvae can be found from the end of September to October. Fully fed larvae hibernate.

References

isabellina
Moths described in 1970
Moths of Asia